Rasaleela may refer to:

Raslila or Rasa dance story of Krishna
Raasaleela, Malayalam film released in 1975 starring Kamal Haasan and Jaya Sudha
Rasaleela (2012 film), Malayalam film starring Darshan and Prathishta